Thomas Sidney Watson (12 December 1927 – 1 September 2021) was an English footballer who played in The Football League for Mansfield Town as a wing-half.

Sid Watson worked at Pleasley Colliery when he signed with Mansfield Town as an amateur in September 1948. In January 1950, he signed a professional contract with the club, but had to wait until the 1951–52 season before making his first-team debut.

Watson went on to become one of Mansfield's longest-serving players of all time. He spent 13 years at the club, and played 307 first-team games for the Stags, including 292 in league competition. He left Mansfield at the end of the 1960–61 season, and then played four seasons for non-league Ilkeston Town.

After his retirement from professional football, Watson was an employee at King's Mill Hospital in Sutton-in-Ashfield until his retirement in 1992. 

He died on 1 September 2021, aged 93.

References

1927 births
2021 deaths
Footballers from Mansfield
English footballers
Association football wing halves
English Football League players
Mansfield Town F.C. players
Ilkeston Town F.C. (1945) players